Mohamed Ghrib (born 24 January 1960) is a retired Algerian international footballer. He represented Algeria in the 1980 Summer Olympics.

References

External links
Mohamed Ouamar Ghrib FIFA Record at fifa.com
 
 

1960 births
Living people
Footballers from Algiers
Algerian footballers
Algeria international footballers
Olympic footballers of Algeria
Footballers at the 1980 Summer Olympics
1980 African Cup of Nations players
Association football midfielders
21st-century Algerian people